The provinces of Argentina are often grouped into eight geographical regions.

Regions
From West to East and North to South, these are:
Argentine Northwest: Jujuy, Salta, Tucumán, Catamarca
Gran Chaco: Formosa, Chaco, Santiago del Estero
Mesopotamia (or Littoral): Misiones, Entre Ríos, Corrientes
Cuyo: San Juan, La Rioja, Mendoza, San Luis
Pampas: Córdoba, Santa Fe, La Pampa, Buenos Aires
Patagonia: Rio Negro, Neuquén, Chubut, Santa Cruz, Tierra del Fuego

Nevertheless, there are different approaches to the Argentine regions. The Pampas are often separated into Humid Pampa and Dry Pampas, and sometimes in Llanura Pampeana and Sierras Pampeanas.  Other geographical analysis include other defined regions, being Comahue and Chaco Central among the most common.

Regardless of the regions system used, some provinces are shared by more than one region. For instance, Southwestern Santiago del Estero is sometimes considered part of the Sierras area, or even the Humid Pampa, while the Southern part of La Pampa is sometimes called Dry Pampa and included in Patagonia. Finally, La Rioja is sometimes considered part of Cuyo region instead of the Northwest.

Finally, the portion of the Antarctica claimed by Argentina is known as Argentine Antarctica, in which lay a number of Argentine bases.

Extended regions 
Argentine Northwest
Gran Chaco
Mesopotamia, Argentina
Cuyo
Pampas
Humid Pampa
Dry Pampa
Patagonia
Comahue
Argentine Antarctica (under Antarctic Treaty)

See also
Administrative divisions of Argentina
Climatic regions of Argentina
General:
Geography of Argentina

Bibliography

References 

 
Subdivisions of Argentina
Regions
Regions
Argentina